Malacca was a British Crown colony from 1946 to 1957. It came under British sovereignty after the signing of the Anglo-Dutch Treaty of 1824, and had been part of the Straits Settlements until 1946.

During World War II, it was occupied by the Japanese from 1942 to 1945. After the post-war dissolution of the Straits Settlements, Penang and Malacca become Crown colonies in the Federation of Malaya while Singapore became a standalone Crown colony separate from Malaya. In 1955, Tunku Abdul Rahman held a meeting with the British to discuss the end of British rule in Malacca with a merger with Malayan Union (which was then replaced by Federation of Malaya). On 31 August 1957, when Malaya achieved its independence from the United Kingdom, Malacca was integrated as part of the federation, which later known as Malaysia when it merged with another territories in British Borneo.

Resident Commissioners 

Sep 1945 - 31 Mar 1946, James Calder (acting)              
1946 - Nov 1947, Edward Victor Grace Day
24 Nov 1947 - 7 Mar 1949, John Falconer
1949, William Cecil Taylor
25 Oct 1949 - 1954, George Evans Cameron Wisdom
20 Dec 1950 - 9 Jan 1951, Jonathan Edgar Meredith Cave, acting for Wisdom
20 Dec 1951 - 6 Jan 1952, Jonathan Edgar Meredith Cave, acting for Wisdom                    
18 Apr 1952 - 21 Oct 1952, Harold George Hammett 
21 Apr 1954 - 31 Aug 1957, Harold George Hammett           
28 Aug 1954 - 15 Sep 1954, Fulwar Rupert Caven Fowle, acting for Hammett
25 Sep 1956 - Feb 1957, Maurice John Hayward, acting for Hammett  
1957, Albert William Nicholson

References

Straits Settlement of Malacca
British Malaya
Former countries in Malaysian history
Straits Settlements